Titiwangsa is one of the main areas located in the outskirts of Kuala Lumpur, Malaysia. The Kuala Lumpur General Hospital is located south of Titiwangsa. The current member of parliament for Titiwangsa is Johari Abdul Ghani from Barisan Nasional-UMNO.

The Titiwangsa Lake Gardens has facilitated cycling and water ball activities. The Eye on Malaysia, a large observation wheel, was located here in 2007 - 2008 before being transferred to Malacca where it was dismantled in 2010.

Tourist attractions

 Titiwangsa Lake Gardens
 Istana Budaya
 Titiwangsa Stadium
 National Library of Malaysia
 Kampong Bharu

Transportation
Titiwangsa can be accessed through the Titiwangsa LRT and Monorail stations. In future the Hospital Kuala Lumpur MRT Station will also provide accessibility to the suburb, planned to be operational in 2023.

References

Suburbs in Kuala Lumpur